After Stonewall is a 1999 documentary film about the 30 years of gay rights activism since the 1969 Stonewall riots directed by John Scagliotti. It is the sequel to the Scagliotti-produced 1984 film Before Stonewall and is narrated by musician Melissa Etheridge. Participants include Dorothy Allison, Jewelle Gomez, Rita Mae Brown, Craig Lucas, Arnie Kantrowitz, Barbara Gittings, Barbara Smith, Larry Kramer and Barney Frank.

Participants

Awards
In 1999, After Stonewall won the Audience Award for Outstanding Documentary Feature at L.A. Outfest. The following year it was nominated for a GLAAD Media Award.

References

External links
 
 

1999 documentary films
1999 films
American documentary films
American LGBT-related films
Documentary films about United States history
1990s English-language films
Historiography of LGBT in the United States
Documentary films about LGBT topics
American sequel films
First Run Features films
1999 LGBT-related films
1990s American films